Blue Peter Special Assignment is a factual BBC TV series broadcast in the 1970s and early 1980s, the first spin-off from the long running BBC series Blue Peter. It ran regularly from 1973 until 1981, usually at weekends on BBC1, and was heavily promoted on Blue Peter itself. The concept for the series was developed after Valerie Singleton had presented a successful documentary 'special' with HRH Princess Anne when she had visited Kenya in 1971. The Special Assignment series was mainly produced by Edward Barnes and presented initially by Valerie Singleton and later by Peter Purves and Lesley Judd both of whom had been presenters on Blue Peter itself.

Series One featured Valerie Singleton looking at six European Capital Cities. These included Rome, Paris, London, Edinburgh, Amsterdam and Brussels. The first programme to be filmed was the one featuring Rome and included a personal address to the children of Britain from Pope Paul VI in The Vatican.

Series Two continued to feature Singleton looking at European Cities and included Dublin, York and Madrid. Later series looked at Islands and included The Isle of Wight, The Isle of Man, Hong Kong, Malta and Venice, even though Venice had also featured in an earlier series as a 'city'. Later the show began to look at famous houses or famous individuals and included biographies of Vivaldi, The Brontë Sisters, The Duke of Wellington, Saint Therese of Lisieux, Marie Antoinette and Rudyard Kipling and both Lesley Judd and Peter Purves began presenting the series in place of Singleton.

The series in 1977 was presented jointly by Peter Purves and Lesley Judd, with the theme of 'twin towns'.

The final series was co-presented alternately by Singleton and Peter Purves, being broadcast in 1981. The series theme was 'Rivers', with Singleton examining the Yukon and Niagara, while Purves reported on the Tamar, the Tweed and the Singapore Rivers.

Spin off books were published covering the first two series.

Episodes

Blue Peter Royal Safari 

Repeated Monday, 7 June 1971 at 7:20pm and Monday, 3 April 1972 at 5:00pm on BBC1.

Series 1: European Capitals 
Valerie Singleton reports on six capital cities of Europe. Produced by Edward Barnes.

The series was repeated on BBC1 in November/December 1973 with the broadcast order changed to: Rome, Amsterdam, Edinburgh, Paris, City of London, Vienna.

Series 2: European Cities 
Valerie Singleton reports on five European cities. Produced by Edward Barnes.

Series 3: Islands 
Valerie Singleton reports on six islands. Produced by Edward Barnes.

A repeat season was broadcast in October 1975 on BBC1, featuring the following episodes:
 Hong Kong (3 October 1975)
 Brussels (10 October 1975)
 York (17 October 1975)
 Madrid (24 October 1975)
 Amsterdam (31 October 1975)

Series 4: Great Houses 
Great names of history whose houses still exist. Produced by Edward Barnes.

Series 5: Twin Towns 
Peter Purves and Lesley Judd visit five different sets of twin towns. Produced by Edward Barnes.

Series 6: Biographies 
Peter Purves investigates dramatic settings for the lives of six great personalities from Italy, France and England. Produced by Edward Barnes.

Series 7: Rivers 
A series of five programmes produced by Edward Barnes.

External links
 

1973 British television series debuts
1981 British television series endings
1970s British children's television series
1980s British children's television series
BBC children's television shows
British television spin-offs
English-language television shows